KRFO-FM (104.9 MHz) is a radio station airing a country music format, licensed to Owatonna, Minnesota.  KRFO-FM is owned by Townsquare Media.

On August 30, 2013, a deal was announced in which Townsquare Media would acquire 53 Cumulus Media stations, including KRFO-FM, for $238 million. The deal was part of Cumulus' acquisition of Dial Global; Townsquare and Dial Global were both controlled by Oaktree Capital Management. The sale to Townsquare was completed on November 14, 2013.

References

External links
KRFO-FM's official website

Country radio stations in the United States
Radio stations in Minnesota
Townsquare Media radio stations
Radio stations established in 1966
1966 establishments in Minnesota